Kochanovce may refer to:

Kochanovce, Humenné, in Humenné District, Slovakia
Kochanovce, Bardejov, in Bardejov District, Slovakia
Adamovské Kochanovce, a village and municipality in Trenčín District, Trenčín Region, Slovakia

See also
Kochanów (disambiguation)